James A. Gallagher (January 16, 1869 – December 8, 1957) was an American banker, businessman, and Republican member of the United States House of Representatives from Pennsylvania.

Early life
James A. Gallagher was born in Philadelphia, Pennsylvania on January 16, 1869. He attended the public schools and Philadelphia's Pierce College from 1891 to 1893. Professionally, he began work in merchandise warehousing and transportation in 1886, and later worked in the banking industry.

Congress
Gallagher was elected to Congress as a Republican in November of 1942, defeating three-term Democratic incumbent Leon Sacks. In 1944, he lost his re-election bid to Democrat William A. Barrett, who rode to victory on the coattails of the very popular Franklin D. Roosevelt. Two years later, Gallagher returned to Washington during the Republican sweep of Congress in 1946, but would lose renomination in 1948 to Republican John De Nero, who went on to lose to Barrett in November, 53-47%. Barrett went on to represent Philadelphia in Congress for 26 more years until his death in 1976.

As a Congressman, Gallagher had a generally conservative voting record, voting with the Republican Party in 89 and 86 percent of his votes in the 78th and 80th Congresses, respectively. Some of Gallagher's most important votes included voting present on the 1944 G.I. Bill, voting for the Taft-Hartley Act, and voting to amend the United States Constitution to establish term limits. All three bills passed. Gallagher also supported strengthening the U.S. military during the opening stages of the Cold War and reducing inflation. Additionally, he also had a pro-civil rights voting record, voting for an anti-poll tax bill in 1947. During his tenures, Gallagher served on three committees - the Census, Pensions, and Printing committees during his first term, and the House Administration Committee during his second. Gallagher cast 182 total votes duering his congressional career, 89 in his first term and 93 in his second. He missed 16 percent of roll call votes, significantly worse than the average of 3.5 percent.

Death
After losing his congressional primary in 1948, Gallagher returned to private life in Philadelphia. He died on December 8, 1957, at age 88. He was interred at the Holy Cross Cemetery in Yeadon, Pennsylvania.

Electoral history

|+ Pennsylvania's 1st congressional district: Results 1942-1946
! Year
!
! Subject
! Party
! Votes
! %
!
! Opponent
! Party
! Votes
! %
|-
|1942
||
| |James A. Gallagher
| |Republican
| |44,519
| |53.45
||
| |Leon Sacks (inc.)
| |Democratic
| |38,768
| |46.55
|-
|1944
||
| |James A. Gallagher (inc.)
| |Republican
| |52,159
| |41.58
|
| |William A. Barrett
| |Democratic
| |73,289
| |58.42
|-
|1946
||
| |James A. Gallagher
| |Republican
| |70,680
| |57.34
|
| |William A. Barrett (inc.)
| |Democratic
| |52,593
| |42.66

References

1869 births
1957 deaths
Politicians from Philadelphia
Republican Party members of the United States House of Representatives from Pennsylvania